The 2003 season was Molde's 28th season in the top flight of Norwegian football. In Tippeligaen they finished in 9th position.

Molde participated in the Norwegian Cup. On 25 June 2003, Molde was defeated 0-1 at home by Skeid in the third round.

Squad

 (on loan from Rosenborg)

As of end of season.

Competitions

Tippeligaen

Results summary

Results by round

Results

League table

Norwegian Cup

UEFA Cup

Qualifying round

First round

Second round

Squad statistics

Appearances and goals

                                             

|-
|colspan="14"|Players away from Molde on loan:
|-
|colspan="14"|Players who left Molde during the season:
|}

Goal Scorers

See also
Molde FK seasons

References

External links
nifs.no

2003
Molde